Bacacheri Airport  is an airport in Curitiba, Brazil. It is named after the neighbourhood where it is located.

It is operated by CCR.

History
  
The history of Bacacheri airport begins in 1930 as an air field for Military Aviation. In 1942 the Ministry of Air Force officially upgraded the facility to the status of an Air Force Base.

On March 31, 1980 Bacacheri Air Force Base was de-commissioned and its administration handled over to Infraero. However, Bacacheri still has a strong military presence because the Brazilian Integrated Air Traffic Control and Air Defense Center section 2 (Cindacta II) is located in the vicinity of the airport.

In 1997 the airport was closed for scheduled operations and since then it is mostly dedicated to general aviation and aircraft maintenance operations.

Previously operated by Infraero, on April 7, 2021 CCR won a 30-year concession to operate the airport.

Airlines and destinations
No scheduled flights operate at this airport.

Access

See also

List of airports in Brazil

References

External links

Airports in Paraná (state)
Airports established in 1930
Transport in Curitiba